Paolo Roversi (born 1947) is an Italian-born fashion photographer who lives and works in Paris.

Early life 
Born in Ravenna in 1947, Paolo Roversi's interest in photography was kindled as a teenager during a family vacation in Spain in 1964. Back home, he set up a darkroom in a convenient cellar with another keen amateur, the local postman Battista Minguzzi, and began developing and printing his own black & white work. The encounter with a local professional photographer Nevio Natali was very important: in Nevio's studio, Roversi spent many hours realising an important apprenticeship as well as a strong durable friendship.

Career 
In 1970, he started collaborating with the Associated Press: on his first assignment, AP sent Roversi to cover Ezra Pound's funeral in Venice. During the same year, Roversi opened, with his friend Giancarlo Gramantieri his first portrait studio, located in Ravenna, via Cavour, 58, photographing local celebrities and their families. In 1971, he met by chance in Ravenna, Peter Knapp, the Swiss fashion photography and legendary artistic director of Elle magazine. At Knapp's invitation, Roversi visited Paris in November 1973 and has never left.

In Paris, Roversi started working as a reporter for the Huppert Agency but little by little, through his friends, he began to approach fashion photography. The photographers who really interested him then were reporters. At that moment he didn't know much about fashion or fashion photography. Only later, he discovered the work of Avedon, Penn, Newton, Bourdin, and many others.

The British photographer Laurence Sackman took Roversi on as his assistant in 1974.

Roversi endured Sackmann for nine months before starting on his own with small jobs here and there for magazines like Elle and Depeche Mode until Marie Claire published his first major fashion story.

Roversi's career has since bloomed to include celebrity and fashion photography. He has been a regular contributor to American Vogue, and Vogue Italia,  W, Vanity Fair, Interview and i-D. He has also photographed advertising campaigns for Yohji Yamamoto, Comme des Garçons, Dior, Cerruti, GIADA, Yves Saint Laurent, Valentino and Alberta Ferreti.

Technique 
Roversi has said of his technique:

He is known for shooting with 8x10 Polaroid film, and claimed to buy as much as he could find before it was discontinued.

References

Further reading
Interview Paolo Roversi "Ophelia has a Dream"

Fashion photographers
1947 births
Living people
People from Ravenna
Italian photographers
French photographers